Academy Stadium is a football stadium in Manchester, England, forming part of the Etihad Campus. Announced on 19 September 2011 as part of an 80-acre training facility to cater for around 400 youth players at a time, the campus was opened on 8 December 2014. The stadium, known simply as Academy Stadium, was inaugurated by students of Manchester Metropolitan University, who played the official first games on the pitch on 14 December 2014. The stadium is the home stadium of the Elite Development Squad and other senior academy teams, and also of Manchester City Women.

Although not the biggest building of the facility the stadium still features numerous facilities more common to larger stadia, including a press room, board room, offices and retail space. Situated only 400 metres from the City of Manchester Stadium, the Academy Stadium is linked to the mother ground via a 190-metre bridge across the intersection of Ashton New Road and Alan Turing Way.

In 2016, it was used as one of the two venues for that year's World Rugby Under 20 Championship in rugby union. In 2022, it hosted some group stage matches during the UEFA Women's Euro 2022.

UEFA Women's Euro 2022 
The stadium was one of the ten venues used to host matches at the UEFA Women's Euro 2022. It was used to host Group D matches, alongside the New York Stadium.

References

Football venues in Manchester
Rugby union stadiums in England
Women's Super League venues
Manchester City F.C.
Manchester City W.F.C.
2014 establishments in England
UEFA Women's Euro 2022 stadiums